Harold Burnham "Sheriff" Lee (February 15, 1905 – September 4, 1989) was an American professional baseball outfielder. He played in Major League Baseball (MLB) for the Brooklyn Robins, Philadelphia Phillies, and Boston Braves / Bees between 1930 and 1936.

In 752 games over seven seasons, Lee posted a .275 batting average (755-for-2750) with 316 runs, 144 doubles, 40 triples, 33 home runs, 323 RBI, 15 stolen bases and 203 bases on balls. He finished his career with an overall .970 fielding percentage.

On May 30, 1935, Lee replaced Babe Ruth in left field for the Boston Braves for what would be Ruth's last game. 

After his time in the major leagues, Lee went to the Texas League in 1939-40 where he was a player-manager for Dallas.

Hal Lee was a 1928 graduate of Mississippi College where he played football, basketball, and baseball. Lee was Captain of the Mississippi College football team in 1927 and the baseball team in 1928.  Lee is a member of the Mississippi College Athletics Hall of Fame and the Mississippi Sports Hall of Fame.

References

External links

1905 births
1989 deaths
Major League Baseball outfielders
Baseball players from Mississippi
Philadelphia Phillies players
Boston Braves players
Brooklyn Robins players
Boston Bees players
Minor league baseball managers
Macon Peaches players
Atlanta Crackers players
Jersey City Giants players
Nashville Vols players
Dallas Rebels players
Hartford Chiefs players
Cordele Indians players
People from Scott County, Mississippi